Aaj Ka Andha Kanoon (English: Today's Blind Law) is a 2003 Indian Bollywood adult film drama directed by Amit Chandra Sahay.

Main cast
 Sudesh Berry as Insp. Yash
 Priyanka Trivedi
 Vishakha Jhaveri as Jyoti
 Prithvi as Insp. Shakti
 Ramesh Goyal
 Brij Gopal
 Javed
 Roy Mathew
 Bharat
 Kapil
 Rajni
 Bharat Kapoor
 Pawan Kumar
 Bengladeshi Sersabadi (Aman Jalali)
 Mahavir Shah as Shiva (as Late Mahaveer Sah)

References

External links
 

2003 films
2000s Hindi-language films
Films scored by Jay Vijay